The 2008 Campeonato Mineiro de Futebol do Módulo I was the 94th season of Minas Gerais's top-flight professional football league. The season began on January 27 and ended on May 4. Cruzeiro won the title for the 35th time.

Participating teams

League table

Final Tournament

Finals

First leg

Second leg

References 

Campeonato Mineiro seasons
Mineiro